Stanisław Makowiecki (7 November 1942 – 4 February 2015) was a Polish wrestler who competed in the 1972 Summer Olympics. He was born in Siennów.

References

External links
 

1942 births
2015 deaths
Olympic wrestlers of Poland
Wrestlers at the 1972 Summer Olympics
Polish male sport wrestlers
People from Przeworsk County
Sportspeople from Podkarpackie Voivodeship
20th-century Polish people
21st-century Polish people